Hudson's Bay may refer to:

Places
Hudson Bay, a very large bay in northern Canada

Brands and enterprises
Hudson's Bay Company, the oldest surviving corporation in Canada, founded in 1670
Hudson's Bay (department store), a retail subsidiary of the Hudson's Bay Company

Hudson's Bay point blanket wool blanket traded by the Hudson's Bay Company in exchange for beaver pelts.

Art, entertainment, and media
Hudson's Bay (film), a 1941 American film
Hudson's Bay (TV series), a 1959 Western television series

Other
 Hudson's Bay (HBC vessel), operated by the HBC from 1689-1697, see Hudson's Bay Company vessels

See also
Hudson Bay (disambiguation)